Foreign exchange may refer to:

Finance 
 Foreign exchange market, where money in one currency is exchanged for another
 Foreign exchange company, a broker that offers currency exchange and international payments
 Retail foreign exchange platform, speculative trading of foreign exchange by individuals using electronic trading platforms
 Bureau de change, a business whose customers exchange one currency for another
 Currency pair, the quotation of the relative value of a currency unit against the unit of another currency in the foreign exchange market
 Exchange rate, the price for which one currency is exchanged for another
 Foreign-exchange reserves, holdings of other countries' currencies
 International trade, the exchange of goods and services across national boundaries

Media 
 Foreign Exchange (1970 film), a British television film
 Foreign Exchange (2008 film), a 2008 film starring Jennifer Coolidge
 Foreign Exchange (Australian/Irish TV series), a 2004 Australian television series that aired on Nine Network
 Foreign Exchange (CNBC World TV program), an American television business news program that has aired on CNBC World since 2005
 Foreign Exchange (PBS TV program), a 2005–2009 American weekly public television program, previously hosted by Fareed Zakaria, that aired on PBS
 The Foreign Exchange, a hip-hop duo

Other uses 
 Foreign exchange service (telecommunications), connection of a phone to a non-local office
 Foreign student exchange, a school program in which students study in another country for a time
 FC Forex Brașov, a Romanian professional football club from Braşov